Arhaphe carolina is a species of bordered plant bug in the family Largidae. It is found in Central America and North America.

References

Largidae
Articles created by Qbugbot
Insects described in 1850